Les rendez-vous bourgeois is an opéra bouffon in one act by Nicolas Isouard to a French libretto by François-Benoît Hoffmann, in the form of an opéra comique with spoken dialogue between the musical numbers. The work was first performed by the Opéra-Comique at the Salle Feydeau in Paris on 9 May 1807.

It became a regular part of the Opéra-Comique repertoire, being performed over 760 times there up to the 1930s. The score consists of an overture and ten vocal numbers. Once in the public domain it was mounted at the Bouffes-Parisiens and the Théâtre de la Gaîté, then the Théâtre de la Renaissance on 11 March 1879 for 25 performances, with a cast including Jean-François Berthelier as Bertrand, Jane Hading as Charles and Mily-Meyer as Louise. Other notable singers to have sung in the opera include Alice Ducasse, Barnolt (Bertrand), Jean Vieuille, Galli-Marié (Cesar), Esther Chevalier (Julie), and Félix Vieuille (Dugravier).

Roles

Synopsis
The action takes place in 1807 in the living room of a country house, near the forest of Bondy.

Dugravier lives with his daughter Reine, his niece Louise and his servants Julie and Bertrand. The latter is in love with Julie but she favours Jasmin, a valet in a nearby house, visiting the Dugravier home.

Dugravier decides to go to Paris with Bertrand to arrange marriages for Reine and Louise with the sons of two rich gentlemen. They depart at nightfall, through the bandit-ridden forest.

With Dugravier gone, Louise confides to Julie that she has a lover, Charles, with whom she has an assignation that night, while Reine confesses that she too is to meet her own César. 
Charles, César and Jasmin hide upon the unexpected return of Dugravier, who says that he has met brigands on his way. The three young men then escape through a window, but return shortly after, claiming to have fought off the imaginary bandits. They introduce themselves as the two sons of the Parisians, and Dugravier gratefully agrees to all three marriages.

References

Further reading
 Kutsch K. J. and Riemens Leo (2003). Großes Sängerlexikon (fourth edition, in German). Munich: K. G. Saur. .

External links

French-language operas
Opéras bouffons
Opéras comiques
1807 operas
Operas
Operas by Nicolas Isouard
Opera world premieres at the Opéra-Comique